Andrey Korneyev (10 January 1974 – 2 May 2014) was a breaststroke swimmer from Russia, who won the bronze medal in the men's 200 m breaststroke event at the 1996 Summer Olympics in Atlanta, United States. A year earlier he captured the gold medal in the same event at the 1995 European Championships in Vienna, Austria.

Korneyev died on 2 May 2014 of cancer in Moscow at the age of 40.

References

Other sources

1974 births
2014 deaths
Deaths from cancer in Russia
Russian male swimmers
Male breaststroke swimmers
Olympic swimmers of Russia
Olympic bronze medalists for Russia
Swimmers at the 1996 Summer Olympics
World record setters in swimming
Olympic bronze medalists in swimming
Medalists at the FINA World Swimming Championships (25 m)
European Aquatics Championships medalists in swimming
Sportspeople from Omsk
Medalists at the 1996 Summer Olympics
Goodwill Games medalists in swimming
Competitors at the 1998 Goodwill Games
20th-century Russian people
21st-century Russian people